"Flaming June" is an instrumental by American electronica musician BT. Released on June 30, 1997 through Perfecto Records as the lead single from his second studio album ESCM,  it features co-production from German DJ and producer Paul van Dyk, and was remixed by British musician Chicane.

Upon release, the single charted in the UK, peaking at number 19 on the UK Singles Chart. It has been considered an "anthem" of dance music. In 2015, a reimagining of the instrumental was featured on BT's remix album Electronic Opus.

Formats and track listings

Charts

References

External links

BT (musician) songs
1997 singles
1997 songs
Songs written by Paul van Dyk
Trance instrumentals
1990s instrumentals